Breckenridge is a city and county seat of Wilkin County, Minnesota, United States. The population was 3,430 at the 2020 census.

Breckenridge's twin city is Wahpeton, North Dakota. It is part of the Wahpeton, ND—MN Micropolitan Statistical Area. The Bois de Sioux River and the Otter Tail River join at Breckenridge and Wahpeton to form the Red River of the North.

History
Breckenridge was platted in 1857, and named for John Cabell Breckinridge, a U.S. senator from Kentucky and the 14th Vice President of the United States. Breckenridge was also staunchly pro-slavery and was a Major General in the Confederate Army. A post office has been in operation at Breckenridge since 1857. Breckenridge was incorporated in 1908. The city contains one property listed on the National Register of Historic Places, the 1928 Wilkin County Courthouse.

Geography

U.S. Route 75 and Minnesota State Highways 9 and 210 are three of the main routes in the city. Additionally, the city was situated on the Twin Cities to Seattle main line of the Great Northern Railway.  As a result, the Breckenridge station was served by numerous passenger trains through the years until 1979.  The city continues to see freight rail traffic on the now BNSF line.

Demographics

2010 census
As of the census of 2010, there were 3,386 people, 1,445 households, and 861 families living in the city, and it is currently 108 years old. The racial makeup of the city was 96.3% White, 0.2% African American, 1.4% Native American, 0.4% Asian, 0.3% from other races, and 1.4% from two or more races. Hispanic or Latino of any race were 2.5% of the population.

There were 1,445 households, of which 27.4% had children under the age of 18 living with them, 47.5% were married couples living together, 7.8% had a female householder with no husband present, 4.3% had a male householder with no wife present, and 40.4% were non-families. 36.2% of all households were made up of individuals, and 15.5% had someone living alone who was 65 years of age or older. The average household size was 2.24 and the average family size was 2.91.

The median age in the city was 43.3 years. 23.3% of residents were under the age of 18; 7.4% were between the ages of 18 and 24; 21.2% were from 25 to 44; 26.8% were from 45 to 64; and 21.2% were 65 years of age or older. The gender makeup of the city was 49.0% male and 51.0% female.

2000 census
As of the census of 2000, there were 3,559 people, 1,438 households, and 911 families living in the city. The racial makeup of the city was 97.61% White, 0.14% African American, 0.56% Native American, 0.17% Asian, 0.03% Pacific Islander, 0.39% from other races, and 1.10% from two or more races. Hispanic or Latino of any race were 1.71% of the population.

There were 1,438 households, out of which 33.4% had children under the age of 18 living with them, 51.8% were married couples living together, 9.2% had a female householder with no husband present, and 36.6% were non-families. 31.7% of all households were made up of individuals, and 16.6% had someone living alone who was 65 years of age or older. The average household size was 2.38 and the average family size was 3.05.

In the city, the population was spread out, with 26.6% under the age of 18, 7.9% from 18 to 24, 27.1% from 25 to 44, 19.8% from 45 to 64, and 18.7% who were 65 years of age or older. The median age was 38 years. For every 100 females, there were 87.5 males. For every 100 females age 18 and over, there were 86.2 males.

The median income for a household in the city was $37,054, and the median income for a family was $47,500. Males had a median income of $31,869 versus $21,328 for females. The per capita income for the city was $17,059. About 7.3% of families and 9.0% of the population were below the poverty line, including 9.5% of those under age 18 and 11.5% of those age 65 or over.

Notable people
Dick Enderle, professional football player
Heidi Heitkamp, former US Senator from North Dakota
Chuck Klosterman, writer and novelist
Errol Mann, professional football player, member of the Oakland Raiders Super Bowl XI team
Reuben N. Nelson, lawyer and politician
George Putnam, radio newsman
Fritz Scholder, Native American artist
Gerry Sikorski, politician
Cheryl Tiegs, professional model
Adrian P. Winkel, High Commissioner of the Trust Territory of the Pacific Islands

References

External links

 City of Breckenridge

Cities in Minnesota
Cities in Wilkin County, Minnesota
County seats in Minnesota
Wahpeton micropolitan area